Selishche is a rural locality (a selo) in Abakanovskoye Rural Settlement, Cherepovetsky District, Vologda Oblast, Russia. The population was 9 as of 2002.

Geography 
Selishche is located 34 km northwest of Cherepovets (the district's administrative centre) by road. Abakanovo is the nearest rural locality.

References 

Rural localities in Cherepovetsky District